Old Rochester Regional High School (ORR) serves the towns of Marion, Mattapoisett, and Rochester. The school was originally built in 1961 and underwent a major renovation beginning in 2001.  This project added the auditorium and combined the high school with the adjacent Old Rochester Regional Junior High School.  The student population is approximately 700 students.  Although the school is named "Old Rochester", it is not located in the current town of Rochester.  Instead, it was built in Mattapoisett, with its fields leaking into Marion, Massachusetts. The name Old Rochester refers to the original town of Rochester which included all three towns served by ORRHS. ORRHS is a part of the Old Rochester Regional School District.

Athletics
Old Rochester offers a wide variety of different athletic programs for both girls and boys. These include track and field, basketball, ice hockey, football, swim, dance, cheer, field hockey, golf, and cross country.

Academics
ORRHS offers a wide array of classes to students and currently operates 11 departments. Both honors level and AP level courses are offered.

Notable alumni
 Scott Dragos, former American football fullback and tight end who played for the Chicago Bears in 2000-2001
 Conrad Henri Roy III, American man who died by suicide at the age of 18 with encouragement from his girlfriend Michelle Carter

References

External links 

Educational institutions established in 1961
Schools in Plymouth County, Massachusetts
Public high schools in Massachusetts
1961 establishments in Massachusetts